Nebria sierrablancae is a species of ground beetle in the Nebriinae subfamily that is endemic to US state of New Mexico.

References

sierrablancae
Beetles described in 1984
Beetles of North America
Endemic fauna of the United States